Leah Totton (born 22 January 1988) is a Northern Irish practising physician, entrepreneur and former model who won the 2013 series of BBC One's The Apprentice. Her business plan, a cosmetic clinic chain, named Dr Leah Clinics, co-owned with Lord Alan Sugar, launched in 2014. Their business was a success; with their London clinic winning national awards. Dr Leah Clinics expanded to open further branches in London and Essex. She has received media attention for her glamorous appearance, her success on the show, the success of her resulting business and for advocacy of improved ethics and integrity in the cosmetic treatment industry. Despite the success of her business she remained committed to NHS work and continued to work part-time as an accident and emergency doctor.

Background
Leah Totton grew up in Derry, Northern Ireland. She studied medicine at the University of East Anglia in Norwich, graduating as a physician in 2011, aged 23 after working as a model in her late teens. She subsequently registered with the General Medical Council.

In 2013, Totton won the £250,000 prize for business acumen on BBC One's The Apprentice, a British reality television competition that offers the winner an opportunity to start a business with British business magnate Lord Alan Sugar. Along with Lord Alan Sugar, she set up a chain of ethical Cosmetic Clinics, Dr Leah Clinics. She continued work as a physician within the NHS on a part-time basis.

Dr Leah Clinic
In 2014, Dr Leah Clinic, co-owned with Lord Sugar, opened in central London. There was criticism at the time regarding Totton's young age and level of experience by several members of the British Association of Aesthetic Plastic Surgeons (BAAPS). Alongside Lord Sugar she has gone on to open further Dr Leah Clinic branches in Essex and London.

Industry standards
Totton has advocated better regulation and improved standards in the cosmetic industry. She endorsed a 2013 review by Sir Bruce Keogh, NHS medical director, that expressed concern over lack of proper qualifications for some dermal filler treatments. Her expressed reason for being drawn to the field was to help reduce adverse outcomes, which one of her mother's acquaintances had experienced; she has spoken against treating teenagers with botox, and in favour of carefully setting realistic goals from the initial consultation.

Other / Personal life 
She has frequently spoken out on women's issues.

References

1988 births
Living people
Alumni of the University of East Anglia
Models from Derry (city)
The Apprentice (franchise) winners
Businesspeople from Derry (city)
The Apprentice (British TV series) candidates
Medical doctors from Derry (city)